The 2020–21 Championnat National 3 is the fourth season of the fifth tier in the French football league system in its current format. The competition is contested by 168 clubs split geographically across 12 groups of 14 teams. The teams include amateur clubs (although a few are semi-professional) and the reserve teams of professional clubs.

After a suspension starting in October 2020, the season was declared void by the FFF on 24 March 2021 due to the ongoing COVID-19 pandemic in France, with some teams having played just three games.

Teams
On 17 July 2020, the French Football Federation ratified the constitution of the competition, and published the groups as follows:

 120 teams that were not relegated or promoted from the 2019–20 Championnat National 3 groups.
 11 teams relegated from 2019–20 Championnat National 2 after any reprieves.
 1 team reprieved from relegation from 2019–20 Championnat National 3 groups.
 36 teams promoted from Régional 1 leagues (as shown in the table below).

On 27 July 2020, the Appeals committee of the DNCG confirmed that Athlético Marseille would be allowed to play in Championnat National 2, thus temporarily leaving a vacant place in Group D. Three days later, the disciplinary committee of the FFF announced that they were demoting the club back to National 3, due to the production of fraudulent documentation at the end of the 2018–19 season.

Promotion and relegation
If eligible, the top team in each group is promoted to Championnat National 2. If a team finishing top of the group is ineligible, or declines promotion, the next eligible team in that group is promoted.

Generally, three teams are relegated from each group to their respective top regional league, subject to reprieves. Extra teams are relegated from a group if more than one team is relegated to that group from Championnat National 2. In the case that no teams are relegated to a group from Championnat National 2, one less team is relegated from that group to the regional league.

Reserve teams whose training centres are categorised as category 2B or lower cannot be promoted to Championnat National 2 by the rules of the competition.

Impacts of COVID-19 on the competition
On 28 October 2020, French President Emmanuel Macron announced a second COVID-19 lockdown, including the suspension of all amateur football, for four weeks. The following day, the FFF confirmed the suspension of senior football at all levels below Championnat National. By this point in the competition, more than 60 games had been postponed due to positive covid cases impacting one or both teams.

On 24 March 2021, the COMEX (Executive Committee) of the FFF announced end of all amateur championships below Championnat National 2, including Championnat National 3, due to the ongoing COVID-19 situation. The announcement also confirmed no promotions or relegations would take place, with the season void.

League tables
The league standings are a record of the games that took place before the competition was declared void.

Group A: Nouvelle-Aquitaine

Group B: Pays de la Loire

Group C:  Centre-Val de Loire

Group D: Provence-Alpes-Côte d'Azur-Corsica

Group E: Bourgogne-Franche-Comté

Group F: Grand Est

Group H: Occitanie

Group I: Hauts-de-France

Group J: Normandy

Group K: Brittany

Group L: Île-de-France

Group M: Auvergne-Rhône-Alpes

Top scorers

References 

2020
5
Fra
Association football events curtailed and voided due to the COVID-19 pandemic